Thimmapur may refer to several places in India:

Andhra Pradesh 
Thimmapuram, Kakinada, a neighbourhood in Kakinada

Karnataka 
Timmapur, Gadag, a panchayat village in Gadag district
Timmapur, Sindhanur, a panchayat village in Sindhanur taluk, Raichur district

Tamil Nadu 
Thimmapuram, a village in Virudhunagar district
Thimmapur-M-Tadakod, a village in Dharwad district

Telangana 
Thimmapur (Haveli), Warangal, a neighbourhood of Warangal
Thimmapur, Karimnagar district, a village in the Virudhunagar district
Thimmapur, Gudur mandal, a village in Gudur mandal, Warangal district
Thimmapur, Kothagudem mandal, a village in Kothagudem mandal, Warangal district
Thimmapur, Nalgonda district, a village in the Nalgonda district
Thimmapur, Sangam mandal, a village in Sangam mandal, Warangal district
Thimmapur, Venkatapuram mandal, a village in Venkatapuram mandal, Warangal district
Thimmapur, Warangal district, a village in Zaffergadh mandal, Warangal district

See also
 Timmapur (disambiguation)